Akbarabad (also Romanized as Akbarābād; also known as Akbarābād-e Gonbagī) is a village in Gonbaki Rural District, Gonbaki District, Rigan County, Kerman Province, Iran. At the 2006 census, its population was 443, in 104 families.

References 

Populated places in Rigan County